Sivan District is a district (bakhsh) in Ilam County, Ilam Province, Iran. At the 2006 census, its population was 12,070, in 2,424 families.  The District has no cities. The capital is the village of Pagal-e Garab  The District has two rural districts (dehestan): Mishkhas Rural District and Alishervan Rural District. The district was established from Central District on March 9, 2013.

References 

Districts of Ilam Province
Ilam County